Agios Charalambos is a village of the Lagkadas municipality. Before the 2011 local government reform it was part of the municipality of Kallindoia. The 2011 census recorded 78 inhabitants in the village. Agios Charambos is a part of the community of Sarakina.

See also
 List of settlements in the Thessaloniki regional unit

References

Populated places in Thessaloniki (regional unit)